The Walk of Fame is a tribute to famous dogs in London, England.  The initial six inductees were announced in November 2007.  The honours were sponsored by The Kennel Club and television channel Sky Movies.

Candidates included Lassie, Toto from The Wizard of Oz, cartoon dog Gromit, and Tintin's  companion, Snowy.  Some of the candidates are fictional and some are no longer living.  There are 15 dogs being considered.

Announcing the proposed tribute, Kennel Club Secretary Caroline Kisko said, "To immortalize these dogs within Battersea Park, a place intrinsically linked to dogs itself, is very important to the Kennel Club and promotes the importance of dogs within our lives".

Location 
Permanent plaques for each inductee were placed in Battersea Park in London, which is on the south bank of the River Thames. The former Battersea Dogs Home, now called the Battersea Dog and Cats Home, Britain's largest home for abandoned dogs is situated nearby and a well-known landmark.

Judging panel 
Ian Lewis, Director of Sky Movies; Sarah Wright, Editor of Your Dog; James Christopher, Film Critic from The Times; and Caroline Kisko, Kennel Club Secretary are among the panel.

References

External links 
 Battersea Dog and Cats Home

Individual dogs
Dogs in the United Kingdom